Prestes is a Brazilian surname. Notable people called Prestes include:

Vicentino Prestes de Almeida, (born 1900), Brazilian paleontologist
Francisco Prestes Maia, Brazilian urban planner and mayor of São Paulo
Anita Leocádia Prestes (born 1936), Brazilian historian
Júlio Prestes (1882–1946), Brazilian poet, lawyer and politician
Luís Carlos Prestes (1898–1990), Tenente, later communist militant and Brazilian politician
Olga Benário Prestes (1908–1942), German-Brazilian communist militant
Paulão Prestes (born 1988), Brazilian basketball player
Paulo Roberto Prestes (born 1988), Brazilian football player

See also
Prestes Maia (building)
Coluna Prestes, social rebel movement between 1925 and 1927 in Brazil, with links to Tenente revolts
Estação Júlio Prestes, historic railroad station building in São Paulo, Brazil
Fernando Prestes, municipality in the state of São Paulo in Brazil